Haarlovina is a monotypic genus of daesiid camel spiders, first described by Reginald Frederick Lawrence in 1956. Its single species, Haarlovina nielsi is distributed in Afghanistan.

References 

Solifugae
Arachnid genera
Monotypic arachnid genera